The 2014–15 Maltese FA Trophy was the 77th season since its establishment. The competition began on 4 September 2014 and ended with the final on 24 May 2015.

Valletta were the defending champions, but were eliminated in the semi-finals by Birkirkara.

Calendar
Matches began on 4 September 2014 and  concluded on 24 May 2015.

First round
In this round a total of 24 teams compete. Matches were played on 4, 6, 7, 8 & 10 September 2014.

|colspan="3" style="background:#fcc;"|4 September 2014

|-
|colspan="3" style="background:#fcc;"|6 September 2014

|-
|colspan="3" style="background:#fcc;"|7 September 2014

|-
|colspan="3" style="background:#fcc;"|8 September 2014

|-
|colspan="3" style="background:#fcc;"|10 September 2014

|}

Second round
In this round a total of 40 teams compete. Matches were played on 24, 25 & 26 October 2014.

|colspan="3" style="background:#fcc;"|24 October 2014

|-
|colspan="3" style="background:#fcc;"|25 October 2014

|-
|colspan="3" style="background:#fcc;"|26 October 2014

|}

Third round
In this round a total of 32 teams compete. Matches were played on 29, 30 November, 2 and 3 December 2014.

|colspan="3" style="background:#fcc;"|29 November 2014

|-
|colspan="3" style="background:#fcc;"|30 November 2014

|-
|colspan="3" style="background:#fcc;"|2 December 2014

|-
|colspan="3" style="background:#fcc;"|3 December 2014

|}

Fourth round
In this round 16 teams compete. Matches were played on 20 and 21 January 2015.

|colspan="3" style="background:#fcc;"|20 January 2015

|-
|colspan="3" style="background:#fcc;"|21 January 2015

|}

Quarter-finals
In this round 8 teams compete. Matches were played on 13 and 14 February 2015.

|colspan="3" style="background:#fcc;"|13 February 2015

|-
|colspan="3" style="background:#fcc;"|14 February 2015

|}

Semi-finals
Matches to be played on 16 and 17 May 2015.

Final
Match was played on 23 May 2015 at 17:00.

References

External links

Maltese Cup
Cup
Maltese FA Trophy seasons